The Nicholson River is a perennial river of the Mitchell River catchment, located in the East Gippsland region of the Australian state of Victoria.

Course and features
The river flows generally southeast passing through the small town of  before entering Lake King, one of the main lakes in the extensive Gippsland Lakes system. The river descends  over its  course.

The river is impounded by the Nicholson River Dam, that forms a water reservoir used for the supply of town water to Lakes Entrance, until 1995.

In its lower reaches, the river is traversed by the Great Alpine Road, the Princes Highway, and the East Gippsland Rail Trail, a shared purpose rail trail that was formerly the part of the Orbost railway line.

Etymology
There are a number of Australian Aboriginal names for the river including: from the Brabralung language Yowen-burrun and Dart'yung, both meaning "root of water plant"; Geremoot, with no clearly defined meaning; and in the Tatungalung language, Ngarrak walang, meaning "back-stone".

The current name of the river was given by the early colonial explorer and pastoralist, Angus McMillan, who named the river in 1839 in honour of Charles Nicholson, who represented the Port Phillip District on the NSW Legislative Council and was later Colonial Secretary.

See also

Haughtons Flat Diversion Tunnel
List of rivers of Australia

Gallery

References

External links
 
 
 

East Gippsland catchment
Rivers of Gippsland (region)
Victorian Alps